Ibşir Mustafa Pasha was an Ottoman statesman of Abkhazian origin, nephew of the governor and rebel Abaza Mehmed Pasha, and prominent Celali rebel. He was grand vizier of the Ottoman Empire from 28 October 1654 to 11 May 1655. He was also the Ottoman governor of Damascus Eyalet (province) in 1649. He was a briefly damat ("bridegroom") to the Ottoman dynasty, as he married the Ottoman princess Ayşe Sultan.

As governor of Damascus he was defeated by Mulhim ibn Yunus, the Druze emir of the Ma'n dynasty in Mount Lebanon, in a battle at the Qarnana valley in November 1650.

See also
 List of Ottoman Grand Viziers
 List of Ottoman governors of Damascus

References

17th-century Grand Viziers of the Ottoman Empire
Damats
People from the Ottoman Empire of Abkhazian descent